Bioerosion describes the breakdown of hard ocean substrates – and less often terrestrial substrates – by living organisms. Marine bioerosion can be caused by mollusks, polychaete worms, phoronids, sponges, crustaceans, echinoids, and fish; it can occur on coastlines, on coral reefs, and on ships; its mechanisms include biotic boring, drilling, rasping, and scraping. On dry land, bioerosion is typically performed by pioneer plants or plant-like organisms such as lichen, and mostly chemical (e.g. by acidic secretions on limestone) or mechanical (e.g. by roots growing into cracks) in nature.

Bioerosion of coral reefs generates the fine and white coral sand characteristic of tropical islands. The coral is converted to sand by internal bioeroders such as algae, fungi, bacteria (microborers) and sponges (Clionaidae), bivalves (including Lithophaga), sipunculans, polychaetes, acrothoracican barnacles and phoronids, generating extremely fine sediment with diameters of 10 to 100 micrometres. External bioeroders include sea urchins (such as Diadema) and chitons. These forces in concert produce a great deal of erosion. Sea urchin erosion of calcium carbonate has been reported in some reefs at annual rates exceeding 20 kg/m2. 

Fish also erode coral while eating algae. Parrotfish cause a great deal of bioerosion using well developed jaw muscles, tooth armature, and a pharyngeal mill, to grind ingested material into sand-sized particles. Bioerosion of coral reef aragonite by parrotfish can range from 1017.7±186.3 kg/yr (0.41±0.07 m3/yr) for Chlorurus gibbus and 23.6±3.4 kg/yr (9.7 10−3±1.3 10−3 m2/yr) for Chlorurus sordidus (Bellwood, 1995).

Bioerosion is also well known in the fossil record on shells and hardgrounds (Bromley, 1970), with traces of this activity stretching back well into the Precambrian (Taylor & Wilson, 2003).  Macrobioerosion, which produces borings visible to the naked eye, shows two distinct evolutionary radiations.  One was in the Middle Ordovician (the Ordovician Bioerosion Revolution; see Wilson & Palmer, 2006) and the other in the Jurassic (see Taylor & Wilson, 2003; Bromley, 2004; Wilson, 2007).  Microbioerosion also has a long fossil record and its own radiations (see Glaub & Vogel, 2004; Glaub et al., 2007).

Gallery

See also

Marine biogenic calcification

References

Further reading

External links

Bioerosion Website at The College of Wooster

Erosion
Biogeomorphology